Adam Courchaine (born May 23, 1984) is a Canadian former professional ice hockey centre. He last played with the Coventry Blaze in the Elite Ice Hockey League (EIHL).

Playing career
Courchaine was born in Winnipeg, Manitoba. Growing up in Winnipeg], Courchaine dominated at the minor hockey level with the AAA-midget Winnipeg Warriors, putting up 119 points in 50 games.  In 2001–02, he joined the major junior ranks with the Medicine Hat Tigers of the Western Hockey League (WHL).  He was traded during his rookie season to the Vancouver Giants during their inaugural season and became a cornerstone for the franchise in its beginning years.  Courchaine put up a team-high 85 points in his first full season with the Giants, helping them to their first playoff appearance in 2003.  His 43 goals established a Giants' franchise record which remained unbroken until Evander Kane surpassed the mark in 2008–09.  Courchaine was also named a WHL West Second Team All-Star and was subsequently chosen in the off-season by the Minnesota Wild, 219th overall, in the 2003 NHL Entry Draft.

He played two more seasons with the Giants, leading them in scoring for a second consecutive season in 2003–04 with 82 points while being named to the WHL West First All-Star Team.  In four seasons with the Giants, Courchaine led the team in scoring twice and accumulated a franchise all-time leading 126 goals and 273 points in 241 games until both records were broken in 2012 by Brendan Gallagher.  His 147 assists was also a franchise record until it was surpassed by defenceman Jonathon Blum on February 7, 2009.

Graduating from major junior in 2005–06, Courchaine was assigned to the Wild's American Hockey League (AHL) affiliate, the Houston Aeros.  However, he was a regular healthy scratch and was demoted to the ECHL where he played with the Pensacola Ice Pilots and Gwinnett Gladiators.

Although Courchaine was signed overseas by EK Zell am See of Austria, he spent the 2006–07 season inactive. The following season, Courchaine played in the German Deutsche Eishockey Liga with the Füchse Duisburg. He enjoyed more success than his rookie season in the minors and led Duisburg in scoring with 50 points.  In the following 2008–09 season, he joined fellow German team, Düsseldorfer EG. After four year with the team and short stints with Austrian team Graz 99ers and Füchse Duisburg for a second time, he joined the Krefeld Pinguine. In 2013–14, Courchaine led the DEL in scoring, tallying 29 goals and 45 assists in 51 contests.

He parted company with the Krefeld team in January 2015 and signed with EHC Olten of the second division NLB in Switzerland the same month. He had six points (one goal, five assists) in five games for EHC.

Courchaine signed with Czech side HK Hradec Kralove for the 2015–16 campaign. He played for the Hungarian club Alba Volán Székesfehérvár in the early stages of the 2016–17 season, before returning to Germany, joining Düsseldorfer EG for a second stint. At DEG, he inked a deal for the remainder of the season.

On 31 July 2017, Courchaine moved to the UK's EIHL to sign with the Coventry Blaze.

Career statistics

Awards and honours

Records
Vancouver Giants' all-time leading point scorer – 273 (Broken in 2012 by Brendan Gallagher)
Vancouver Giants' all-time leading goal scorer – 126 (Broken in 2012 by Brendan Gallagher)

References

External links

1984 births
Living people
Fehérvár AV19 players
Canadian ice hockey centres
Coventry Blaze players
DEG Metro Stars players
Düsseldorfer EG players
Füchse Duisburg players
Graz 99ers players
Gwinnett Gladiators players
Houston Aeros (1994–2013) players
Krefeld Pinguine players
Medicine Hat Tigers players
Minnesota Wild draft picks
EHC Olten players
Pensacola Ice Pilots players
Ice hockey people from Winnipeg
Stadion Hradec Králové players
Vancouver Giants players
EK Zell am See players
Canadian expatriate ice hockey players in England
Canadian expatriate ice hockey players in Austria
Canadian expatriate ice hockey players in Hungary
Canadian expatriate ice hockey players in Germany
Canadian expatriate ice hockey players in the United States
Canadian expatriate ice hockey players in the Czech Republic